Sarah Champion (born 1969) is a British Labour Party politician and MP for Rotherham.

Sarah Champion may refer to;

 Sarah Champion (journalist) (born 1970), British music journalist
 Sarah Champion (presenter) (born 1977), British television presenter and DJ

See also
 Sara Champion (1946 – 2000), British archaeologist
 Sarah Campion (born 1983), English squash player